The 2014 Brown Bears football team represented Brown University in the 2014 NCAA Division I FCS football season. They were led by 17th year head coach Phil Estes and played their home games at Brown Stadium. They were a member of the Ivy League. They finished the season 5–5, 3–4 in Ivy League play to finish in fifth place. Brown averaged 5,701 fans per game.

Schedule

Source: Schedule

References

Brown
Brown Bears football seasons
Brown Bears football